Dennis Alexander (1935—2011) was an English footballer who played as an inside forward.

Alexander started his career at Nottingham Forest, progressing from the youth team before making his first team debut in 1955. Alexander scored four goals in 20 league appearances for Forest before a brief spell at Brighton & Hove Albion, in which he did not make an appearance. Alexander then signed for Gateshead in 1958, going on to score a single goal in 17 league appearances. Alexander went on to play non-league football with Ilkeston Town, Sutton Town, Long Eaton United (where he was player-manager) and Belper Town.

Sources

References

1935 births
2011 deaths
English footballers
Association football forwards
Nottingham Forest F.C. players
Brighton & Hove Albion F.C. players
Gateshead F.C. players
Ilkeston Town F.C. (1945) players
Belper Town F.C. players
Long Eaton United F.C. players
English Football League players
Sutton Town A.F.C. players
English football managers
Long Eaton United F.C. managers